is a style of karate which was founded by Takayuki Kubota. Gosoku stands for hard and fast, which suggests a combination of techniques both from the fast and dynamic Shōtōkan style as well as from the strength-focused Gōjū-ryū style.

Background
The International Karate Association (IKA) was formed in Tokyo, Japan in 1953 for the purpose of teaching and promoting the Gosoku style of karate. Gosoku-ryū, "the style of force with speed", incorporates the methods of Goju-ryū and Shotokan karate with aikido, jujitsu, and judo. It is applied so as to encompass any attacker from all angles.

In 1964, Kubota came to the United States. He was able to gather several talented young men to create the nucleus of the U.S. branch. Under Kubota's tutelage, the IKA has achieved wide recognition in the martial arts world. Members of the organization have won championship titles, including California state, U.S. national, and world championships. The IKA reaches worldwide with headquarters located in Glendale, California.

Belt system
Advancement through the ranks, as marked by belt color, is a process signifying progressively greater control and coordination of mind and body. The length of time involved is largely dependent upon the dedication of the individual student.

The progressive ranks of karate are reflected in the different colored belts. There are two major classifications: the ranks of black belt are called dans, while all those below the rank of black belt are kyus. 

In Gosoku-ryū, there are ten kyu ratings, as follows: 

After achieving shodan, or first degree black belt ranking, a karateka may progress further though the dan ranks up to ju-dan, or tenth degree black belt.

The ju-dan sometimes wears a red belt to distinguish him or herself. Instructors that are 4th dan are sometimes awarded the title of "Shihan-Dai" (deputy master). Instructors that are 5th dan or higher are sometimes awarded the title of "Shihan" (master instructor). Title is not always awarded by rank alone. One must be an active instructor and be awarded the rank by Kubota.

Major differences from other styles
Gosoku-ryū is similar to Shotokan karate. It differs from Shotokan in that it incorporates the linear power movements of Shotokan with the speed and soft circular motions of Gōjū-ryū. The meaning of Gosoku-Ryu is "Hard and fast". Emphasis is put on practical application and sparring. Stances are generally shorter when in defensive positions and transition to longer stances when power moves are delivered. During kicks, including kihon, hands are kept in guard (and not spread aside). Gosoku-ryū teaches quick leg sweeps and take-downs; in kumite, attacks often end on the floor. Fast footwork which adds speed and power by utilizing the rotation of the hip makes Gosoku-ryū different from other styles. Gosoku-ryū also incorporates aikido, judo, and jujitsu techniques, which are used in ground fighting and for control and restraint techniques that are taught to law enforcement.

Kobudo weapons
Many weapons are practiced in the dojo: Kubotan, Tonfa, Kama, Jō, Bokuto, Bokken, Shinai, Tsue (walking cane), and the Katana (Japanese sword).  Kubota trained with Taira Shinken learning ancient Kobudo katas while developing his own for his school. The Kobudo kata created by him include:

 Tonfa: Washi no kata, Juji no uke.
 Jō: Keibo jitsu, Ken shin ryū.
 Tsue (walking cane): Tsue ichi no kata, ni no kata, san no kata, yon no kata, go no kata, roku no kata, Mawashi no kata.
 Katana (created by Kubota): Sankaku giri, Atemi no kata, Kubo giri, Gyaku giri, Iaido ichi no kata, ni no kata, san no kata, Toshin.
 Bokken: Ken no Michi, Ken no Mai

Prominent students 
 Kyoshi Hank Hamilton 7th dan
 James Caan 6th Dan
 Hanshi Temoanarupe Inuhaere 9th Dan
 Kyoshi Natasha Inuhaere 8th Dan
 Hanshi Mike Ireland 9th Dan
 Kancho Takemasa Okuyama 10th Dan

References

External links
 www.IKAKarate.com
 www.karatesensei.com
 Japan Martial Arts Centre website
 International Gosoku-Ryu Karate-Do Association

Karate
Japanese martial arts